This is a list of Tamil population per city (excluding Tamil Nadu & Pondicherry).

See also
 List of countries and territories where Tamil is an official language
 Tamil population by nation
 States of India by Tamil speakers

Notes

References

Tamil
Tamil